Aghajari (also Romanized as Āghājārī and Āghājarī) is a village in Dizajrud-e Sharqi Rural District, Qaleh Chay District, Ajab Shir County, East Azerbaijan Province, Iran. At the 2006 census, its population was 407, in 75 families.

References 

Populated places in Ajab Shir County